Eric Bergeson (born January 1, 1966) is a former American football defensive back. He played for the Atlanta Falcons in 1990.

References

1966 births
Living people
American football defensive backs
BYU Cougars football players
Atlanta Falcons players